Lingkong Road is a station on Line 2 of the Shanghai Metro in the town of Chuanshaxin, Pudong.

History 
Construction on Line 2 was finished through  by March 2010. This extension originally used four-carriage trains as opposed to the eight-carriage trains used west of Guanglan Road, which served as the transfer point until eight-carriage through trains were introduced in April 2019.

Facilities 
The station is located in the town of Chuanxinsha in Pudong. The station, shaped like an oblong rectangle, is nestled at the corner of its namesake road and West Huazhou Road. There are three exits, numbered 3, 4 and 5.  Exit 3 is the only one located south of the line, reaching surface level near Huazhou Road. Exit 4 is located nearer to Lingkong Road than exit 5, both of which are located north of the line. Located beneath a small farm amid the city, the station is close to the Taiping Market.

Service 
The train operates from 6:45 to 21:15 westbound and begins and ends service four minutes later eastbound. On weekdays, trains leave the station approximately every eight minutes and thirty seconds.

References 

Shanghai Metro stations in Pudong
Railway stations in China opened in 2010
Line 2, Shanghai Metro
Railway stations in Shanghai